Tomilin Glacier is a glacier over 15 nautical miles (28 km) long, draining north from Pope Mountain in central Wilson Hills. It enters the sea east of Goodman Hills and Cape Kinsey, forming a substantial glacier tongue. The glacier was photographed from aircraft of U.S. Navy Operation Highjump in 1947, and by the Soviet Antarctic Expedition in 1958. Named by the latter for Soviet polar aviator Mikhail N. Tomilin (1908–52), who perished in the Arctic.

Glaciers of Oates Land